Spinebill is the name given to two members of the honeyeater family, both in the genus Acanthorhynchus, which is Latin for "spine bill". They are around 15 centimetres in length, and are coloured  black, white and chestnut, with a long, downcurved bill. They are native to Australia, with one species in the east and one in the west. They feed on nectar as well as insects, and live mainly in forests, gardens, and other shrubbery habitats.

A 2004 molecular study has shown that the two spinebills are a sister grouping to all other honeyeaters, that is, they diverged earlier than all other species.

Species and distribution
The genus contains two species.

References

External links
 Basic information, eastern spinebill - Birds in Backyards
 Photos, eastern spinebill - Australian Birds Image Database

Taxa named by John Gould